Santa Marta, the Italian-, Portuguese-, and Spanish-language name of the Biblical Martha, is a moderately common toponym in parts of the world where those tongues are or were spoken. There are, additionally, both real and fictional communities sharing the name.

Real-world entities

Brazil
Favela Santa Marta, a favela located in Rio de Janeiro
Colombia
Santa Marta, Magdalena department
 Sierra Nevada de Santa Marta
Mexico
Santa Marta metro station, a station on the Mexico City Metro
Santa Martha, a station on the Cablebús system
Panama
Santa Marta, Panama
Portugal
Santa Marta de Penaguião
Santa Marta Lighthouse (Cascais)
Spain
Santa Marta, Badajoz, a municipality in the province of Badajoz, Extremadura
Santa Marta del Cerro, a municipality in the province of Segovia, Castile and León
Santa Marta de Tormes, a municipality in the province of Salamanca, Castile and León
Santa Marta de Magasca, a municipality in the province of Cáceres, Extremadura
Cubillas de Santa Marta, a municipality in the province of Valladolid, Castile and León
United States
Santa Marta, an early name for Key Biscayne in Florida
Vatican City
Casa Santa Marta, a building, current residence of the pope
Venezuela
Santa Marta (baseball club), La Guaira, Vargas, 1954–1955

Fictional entities

United States
Santa Marta (comics): a fictional city destroyed by DC Comics supervillain Major Disaster